JS Setogiri (DD-156) is an  of the Japan Maritime Self-Defense Force.

Development and design 
The Asagiri class is equipped for combat and interception missions, and is primarily armed with anti-ship weapons. They carry two of the Mk-141 Guided Missile Launching System (GMLS), which are anti-ship missile systems. The ships are also fitted to be used against submarines. They also carry Mk-32 Surface Vessel Torpedo Tubes (SVTT), which can be used as an anti-submarine weapon. The ships have two of these systems abeam to starboard and to port. They are also fitted with an Oto-Melara 62-caliber gun to be used against sea and air targets.

The ship can have up to 220 personnel on board. The ship is also fitted to accommodate for one aircraft. The ship's flight deck can be used to service a SH-60J9(K) Seahawk helicopter.

Construction and career 
Setogiri;; was laid down on 9 March 1987 and launched on 12 September 1988 by Hitachi Zosen Corporation, Maizuru. She was commissioned on 14 February 1990.

The destroyer was dispatched to the Great East Japan Earthquake caused by the 2011 off the Pacific coast of Tōhoku Earthquake on 11 March 2011.

On 26 July 2013, she set sail off the coast of Somalia with the escort ship  as the 16th dispatched anti-piracy action surface corps. She was engaged in missions until December of the same year and returned to Ōminato on 17 January 2014.

From 19 March to 27 April 2016, the ship participated in the open sea practice voyage (flying) with the escort ship Ariake and the training submarine JS Oyashio on 12 April. At the same time, it is the first Maritime Self-Defense Force ship to call at Cam Ranh Bay, a strategic point in central and southern Vietnam.https://www.mod.go.jp/msdf/formal/info/news/201603/20160315-01.pdf 

At around 10:50 pm on 26 August 2017, the SH-60J patrol helicopter on board the ship lost communication during night training. Of the four crew members, one male crew member was rescued after the accident, but the remaining three, including the captain, were missing. The search was completed without finding the remaining crew member.https://www.mod.go.jp/msdf/formal/info/news/201710/20171027-01.pdf  On 3 December 2017, Setogiri'' departed from Ōminato for the Gulf of Aden off the coast of Somalia as the 29th dispatched anti-piracy action surface unit and engaged in missions until April 2018. On 13–14 May while returning to Japan, she conducted joint training with the Indian Navy destroyer  and returned to Ōminato on 3 June.

Gallery

References 

Asagiri-class destroyers
Ships built by Hitachi Zosen Corporation
1988 ships